Pascal Berenguer (born 20 May 1981, in Marseille, France) is a French former professional footballer who played as a midfielder.

After his retirement, he was appointed as head coach for the Tours FC under-19 team in November 2015.

References

External links
 

1981 births
Living people
French people of Catalan descent
French footballers
Footballers from Corsica
Corsica international footballers
Association football midfielders
SC Bastia players
FC Istres players
AS Nancy Lorraine players
RC Lens players
Tours FC players
Ligue 1 players
Ligue 2 players